Parascorpaena moultoni, the coral perch, is a species of marine ray-finned fish belonging to the family Scorpaenidae, the scorpionfishes. They are native to the Western Central Pacific, and are particularly common in the Coral Sea and the East China Sea.

Description 
The coral perch has been described as resembling the ocellate scorpionfish Parascorpaena mcadamsi to the point of being regarded as a junior synonym thereof. The primary differentiating feature of the coral perch is its two sub-orbital spines (as opposed to the ocellate scorpionfish which has three).

References 

Fish described in 1961
Fish of the Pacific Ocean
moultoni